Safia El Emari, (born Safia Mustafa Mohamed Omari, October 20, 1949, in El-Mahalla El-Kubra) is an Egyptian actress. She was appointed as a goodwill ambassador for the United Nations in 1997, she resigned in 2006 in protest of the wars in the Middle East. She began her career as a journalist, after graduating from the Faculty of Commerce, Cairo University. She studied Russian language and worked as an interpreter at international conferences. She participated in many Egyptian movies and TV series.

She was discovered by the artist Galal Issa. They got married and have two sons.

Filmography
 Opera Ayda (TV series) 
Al-massir
El Mohager
 El Mowaten Masry
 Ana elli katalt Elhanash 
Ghosts of Sayala
 Love Also Dies
A'la bab El wazir 
 Hekaya wara kol bab (TV movie) 
 El-azab emra'a
 La waqt lil-demoue'
 Hawanem garden city (TV series) 
 Layali El Helmeya (TV series)

References

1949 births
Egyptian film actresses
Living people
Egyptian television actresses
People from El Mahalla El Kubra